Tamer-e Qarah Quzi (also Romanized as Tamer-e Qarah Qūzī; also known as Tamer) is a village in Tamran Rural District, in the Central District of Kalaleh County, Golestan Province, Iran. At the 2006 census, its population was 3,556, in 693 families.

References 

Populated places in Kalaleh County